Danton is a 1932 French historical drama film directed by André Roubaud and starring Jacques Grétillat, Andrée Ducret and Jacques Dumesnil. It depicts the life of the French revolutionary Georges Danton and his eventual execution by hardliners of the Revolution. It was based in part on the 1929 play The Danton Case by Stanisława Przybyszewska.

Cast
 Jacques Grétillat - Danton
 Andrée Ducret - Gabrielle Danton
 Jacques Dumesnil - Fabre d'Églantine
 André Fouché - Camille Desmoulins
 Simone Rouvière - Lucile Desmoulins
 Octave Berthier - Le père Charpentier
 Marguerite Weintenberger - Louise Danton
 Louis Merlac - Le boucher Legendre
 Thomy Bourdelle - Le général Westermann

References

Bibliography
 Oscherwitz, Dayna. Past Forward: French Cinema and the Post-Colonial Heritage. SIU Press, 2010.
 Stam, Robert & Raengo, Alessandra. A Companion to Literature and Film. John Wiley & Sons, 2004.

External links

1932 films
1930s historical drama films
French historical drama films
Films about Georges Danton
1930s French-language films
Cultural depictions of Georges Danton
Cultural depictions of Maximilien Robespierre
French black-and-white films
1930s French films